Last of the Summer Wine's sixth series originally aired on BBC1 between 4 January and 15 February 1982. All episodes from this series were written by Roy Clarke and produced and directed by Alan J. W. Bell.

The sixth series was released on DVD in region 2 as a combined box set with series 5 on 5 March 2007.

Outline
The trio in this series consisted of:

First appearances

Wesley Pegden (1982, 1984–2002)

List of episodes

Christmas Special (1981)

Regular series

DVD release
The box set for series 5 and 6 was released by Universal Playback in March 2007.

Notes

References

External links
Series 6 at the Internet Movie Database

Last of the Summer Wine series
1982 British television seasons
1981 British television seasons